The Apollo-Theater is a theatre in Siegen, in the Arnsberg region of North Rhine-Westphalia, Germany.

Theatres in North Rhine-Westphalia